Béla Nagy may refer to:

 Béla Nagy (archer) (born 1943), Hungarian archer
 Béla Nagy (sport shooter) (born 1941), Hungarian Olympic sport shooter
 Bela De Nagy (1893–1945), American Olympic fencer
 Béla Nagy (ice hockey) (born 1957), Romanian ice hockey player
 Béla Nagy (wrestler) (born 1962), Hungarian Olympic wrestler
 Béla Nagy (ichthyologist), Hungarian ichthyologist